Donji Vinjani or Vinjani Donji is a village near Imotski, Croatia; population 2,169 (census 2011).

Notable people
Ivan Bušić Roša, hajduk commander
Ferdo Bušić, historian
Bruno Bušić, Croatian dissident
Ante Rebić, professional football player

References

Populated places in Split-Dalmatia County